Sounder may refer to:

Sounder (novel), a book by William H. Armstrong
Sounder (film), a film based on the novel
Sounder, a group of wild boar or domestic pigs foraging in woodland;  see List of animal names
Sounder, a device that transmits a signal and uses the returned signal to measure characteristics of the propagation medium
Echo sounder, a device used to measure water depth using sonar
Atmospheric sounder, also known as SODAR
Sounder (band), a Brazilian thrash metal band.

in the Seattle area:
Sounder commuter rail, a transit system serving the Puget Sound area
Sounder, a member of the Seattle Sounders professional soccer teams

in telecommunications:
Sounder (radio). a station identifier in a radio broadcast
Telegraph sounder, a device for detecting operability in a telegraph
 a Windows command line audio player for WAV format

in spacecraft
Atmospheric sounder, a space-borne instrument for passive atmospheric measurements